Jovana Arsić (born 10 September 1992) is a Serbian rower. She is competing in the 2020 Summer Olympics.

References

External links

1992 births
Living people
Sportspeople from Zrenjanin
Rowers at the 2020 Summer Olympics
Serbian female rowers
Olympic rowers of Serbia
Rowers at the 2010 Summer Youth Olympics